Bhagwanpur may refer to:

India

 Bhagwanpur (community development block), Vaishali district, Bihar
 Bhagwanpur, Bihar, a town in the Bhagwanpur block
 Bhagwanpur, Punjab, a census town in Jalandhar district
 Bhagwanpur, Bhulath, a village in Bhulath tehsil, Kapurthala district, Punjab
 Bhagwanpur, Kapurthala, a village in Kapurthala district, Punjab
 Bhagwanpur, Uttar Pradesh, a village in Kushinagar district
 Bhagwanpur, Uttarakhand, a town and tehsil in Haridwar district 
 Bhagwanpur (Uttarakhand Assembly constituency)

Nepal
 Bhagwanpur, Nepal, a village

See also 
 Bhagwanpura (disambiguation)